Claude de Bermen de la Martinière (30 May 1636 – 14 April 1719) was born in France and came to New France in 1662. Through marriage, he became the owner of a large seigneury and held a number of important positions throughout his time in Canada.

La Martinière married the widow of Jean de Lauson in 1664 and began the development of the Lauson seigneury. He pursued a career in law and held various positions involving the Conseil Souverain and, subsequently, the renamed Conseil Supérieur. He was the acting governor general of the Conseil Souverain for a period and, in 1714, became the subdelegate of the intendant, Michel Bégon. His actions during an absence of Bégon brought to light the intendant's role in a grain shortage which was causing much hardship. Subsequent riots appear to give justification to La Martinière's concerns about a grain monopoly.

Claude had two sons, one of whom, Claude-Antoine de Bermen de La Martinière, had a distinguished career in the colonial regular forces.

Lake Bermen, in central Quebec, is named after him.

References

External links

 Biography at the Dictionary of Canadian Biography Online
 Genealogie Quebec

Bermen, Claude de